Senožeče is a settlement in the Municipality of Divača in the Littoral region of Slovenia.

Name
Senožeče was attested in historical sources as Sehenossecsch in 1217, Senosensach in 1297, and Sinesecha in 1310, among other spellings. The name is derived from the plural demonym *Sěnožęťani 'residents of a hayfield or meadow' (from the common noun *sěnožętъ '(mountain) meadow, meadow mown once a year').

Church

The parish church in the settlement is dedicated to Saint Bartholomew and belongs to the Koper Diocese.

Notable people
Senožeče is the birthplace of the Olympic fencer Rudolf Cvetko and the anti-Fascist insurgent leader Danilo Zelen.

References

External links

Senožeče on Geopedia

Populated places in the Municipality of Divača